The 1971–72 Football League season was Birmingham City Football Club's 69th in the Football League and their 31st in the Second Division. They finished in second place in the 22-team division, so were promoted to the First Division for 1972–73, despite never having been in the promotion positions until after the final game of the season.

They entered the 1971–72 FA Cup in the third round proper and progressed to the semi-final, in which they lost to Leeds United. This was the third year of five in which the losing semifinalists were required to compete in a "Match for third place"; following a goalless 90 minutes, Birmingham beat Stoke City in a penalty shootout, the first time this method had been used to determine the result of an FA Cup match. They lost to Queens Park Rangers in their opening match in the second round of the League Cup, and finished fourth of the six English entrants in the third staging of the Anglo-Italian Cup, a tournament held after the end of the league season.

Twenty-five players made at least one appearance in nationally organised first-team competition, and there were ten different goalscorers. Defender Roger Hynd, midfielder Alan Campbell and centre-forward Bob Latchford played in all 53 first-team matches over the season. Latchford finished as leading goalscorer with 30 goals, of which 23 came in league competition. The average attendance in Second Division matches exceeded 32,000.

Football League Second Division

League table (part)

FA Cup

League Cup

Anglo-Italian Cup

Clubs were classified according to total points (2 for a win, 1 for a draw) added to goals scored. The top club of each national section qualified for the final.

Appearances and goals

Numbers in parentheses denote appearances as substitute.
Players with name struck through and marked  left the club during the playing season.
Players with names in italics and marked * were on loan from another club for the whole of their season with Birmingham.

See also
Birmingham City F.C. seasons

References
General
 
 
 Source for match dates and results: 
 Source for lineups, appearances, goalscorers and attendances: Matthews (2010), Complete Record, pp. 378–79, 477, 483.

Specific

Birmingham City F.C. seasons
Birmingham City